Donald Christopher "Don" Burgess (born 8 February 1933) is a retired track cyclist from Great Britain, who represented his native country at the 1952 Summer Olympics in Helsinki, Finland. There he won the bronze medal in the men's 4,000 metres team pursuit, alongside Alan Newton, George Newberry, and Ronald Stretton. Burgess also competed at the 1956 Summer Olympics in Melbourne, Australia, and once again won bronze.

References

External links
 
 
 

1933 births
Living people
English track cyclists
English male cyclists
Cyclists at the 1952 Summer Olympics
Cyclists at the 1956 Summer Olympics
Olympic cyclists of Great Britain
Olympic bronze medallists for Great Britain
People from Hendon
Olympic medalists in cycling
Cyclists from Greater London
Medalists at the 1952 Summer Olympics
Medalists at the 1956 Summer Olympics